Philippines national volleyball team may refer to:

Philippines men's national volleyball team
Philippines women's national volleyball team